The  Eastern League season began on approximately April 1 and the regular season ended on approximately September 1. 

The Albany-Colonie Yankees defeated the Harrisburg Senators 3 games to 0 to win the Eastern League Championship Series.

Regular season

Standings

Note: Green shade indicates that team advanced to the playoffs; Bold indicates that team advanced to ELCS; Italics indicates that team won ELCS

Playoffs

Semi-finals Series
The Albany-Colonie Yankees defeated the Hagerstown Suns 3 games to 0.
The Harrisburg Senators defeated the Canton–Akron Indians 3 games to 1.

Championship Series
The Albany-Colonie Yankees defeated the Harrisburg Senators in the ELCS 3 games to 0.

References

External links
1991 Eastern League Review at thebaseballcube.com

Eastern League seasons